Wolverton Viaduct is a railway bridge carrying the West Coast Main Line over the River Great Ouse to the north of Wolverton, part of the City of Milton Keynes, in south-eastern England. Built in 1837 for the London and Birmingham Railway under the supervision of Robert Stephenson, it is one of the largest and most notable structures on the route and is a grade II listed building.

Description
Crossing the River Great Ouse and its broad valley was one of the largest engineering challenges to face the London and Birmingham Railway (LBR) and Robert Stephenson, its chief engineer. It is built from red brick in the English Bond pattern and partially dressed in red sandstone. Repairs have been made with blue engineering bricks. The piers have "D"-shaped cutwaters.

The bridge has a stone-coped parapet which is broken at regular intervals to provide refuges. The piers at each end are much larger and have additional stonework including a frieze. There are substantial abutments at each end, into which are cut four small, rounded arches with a  span. The first two of these rise from a solid wall and start at half the height of the main arches. The third arch is of full height and the fourth is partially buried. A cornice runs the length of the bridge, embellished with dentillation (carved blocks) where the terminating piers meet the abutments.

History
The viaduct was built for the LBR, whose chief engineer was Robert Stephenson, and opened in 1838. The LBR became a constituent of the London and North Western Railway (LNWR) in 1846. The extension is entirely in blue brick and the join can be clearly seen from underneath as the extension is not bonded to the original structure. The route (now the West Coast Main Line) was electrified by British Rail in 1958 and masts were attached to the viaduct to carry overhead lines.

The viaduct was one of the features illustrated by John Cooke Bourne's Series of Lithographic Drawings on the London and Birmingham Railway in 1839. Despite the alterations, the appearance of the viaduct has changed little since Bourne's depiction. Its design is similar to Brandon Viaduct to the north west, between Rugby and Coventry but Wolverton's is the longest and tallest viaduct, and the one with the most and widest arches, of several similar structures built by the LBR.

Historic England describes the bridge as "one of the principal landmarks of the first trunk railway and one of the earliest viaducts on this scale". Gordon Biddle, a railway historian, described it as a "graceful structure" and the "most prominent LBR monument" in the vicinity of Wolverton, a town dominated by railways. The terminating piers and large abutments decorated with arches are common features to several of Stephenson's viaducts on the LBR and show an early form of design standardisation. The bridge has been a grade II listed building for its historical and architectural interest since July 2001.

References

1837 establishments in England
Bridges completed in 1837
Bridges across the River Great Ouse
Bridges in Buckinghamshire
Wolverton
Buildings and structures in Milton Keynes
Grade II listed bridges
Railway viaducts in Buckinghamshire
London and Birmingham Railway